Hassan Hamdan may refer to:

 Hasan Hamdan, Lebanese actor and voice actor
 Hassan Abdullah Hamdan or Mahdi Amel (born 1936), Lebanese journalist and poet